Rose Doudou Guéï (died September 19, 2002) was wife of the Head of State of Cote d'Ivoire, Robert Guéï, and consequently First Lady of Ivory Coast from 1999 to 2000.

Coup in 2000
A mutiny within Cote d'Ivoire's military evolved into a coup d'état in 2000, and General Robert Guéï was installed as the first military ruler of Cote d'Ivoire.

Death 
A group opposed to the military regime staged a new coup d'état in 2002. Robert Guéï and Rose Doudou Guéï were killed in September 2002.  Associates of Robert Guéï claimed that he and Rose Doudou Guéï were executed, along with several other people, as they sat down for a meal at their home in Abidjan.  The forces of the new President,  Laurent Gbagbo, were accused of being behind the killings.

She was buried, reportedly to public indifference, on May 5, 2006, in front of Saint-Paul Cathedral in the Plateau area of Abidjan north, but her remains are now located at the municipal cemetery of Port-Bouët in Abidjan south.

Aftermath
Following the assassinations, Laurent Gbagbo became Cote d'Ivoire's President, having emerged victorious from the First Ivorian Civil War, during which many thousands were killed.

Franck Guéï, the eldest son of Robert and Rose Doudou Guéï, allied himself with Gbagbo, and was Cote d'Ivoire's Minister of Sports, Youth and Leisure until Gbagbo was overthrown during the Second Ivorian Civil War in 2011. Gbagbo was replaced by Alassane Ouattara. Robert Guéï's reputation has been rehabilitated under Ouattara. Francis Pédou Guéi, younger brother of Franck Guéi, has allied himself with Ouattara, and is active in the party of his father, the UDPCI.

See also

 List of people assassinated in Africa

References 

2002 deaths
Year of birth missing
Assassinated Ivorian people
First ladies of Ivory Coast
People from Abidjan
People murdered in Ivory Coast
Violence against women in Ivory Coast